Dorcadion cinerarium is a species of beetle in the family Cerambycidae. It was described by Johan Christian Fabricius in 1787, originally under the genus Lamia. It is known from Ukraine, Azerbaijan, and Russia.

Subspecies
 Dorcadion cinerarium adygorum Lazarev, 2011
 Dorcadion cinerarium azovense Lazarev, 2011
 Dorcadion cinerarium bartenevi Lazarev, 2011
 Dorcadion cinerarium belousovi Lazarev, 2011
 Dorcadion cinerarium cinerarium (Fabricius, 1787)
 Dorcadion cinerarium deniz Lazarev, 2011
 Dorcadion cinerarium gorodinskii Danilevsky, 1996
 Dorcadion cinerarium macropoides Plavilstshikov, 1932
 Dorcadion cinerarium napolovi Lazarev, 2011
 Dorcadion cinerarium panticapaeum Plavilstshikov, 1951
 Dorcadion cinerarium papayense Lazarev, 2014
 Dorcadion cinerarium perroudi Pic, 1942
 Dorcadion cinerarium sindorum Lazarev, 2011
 Dorcadion cinerarium skrylniki Lazarev, 2011
 Dorcadion cinerarium smetanai Lazarev, 2011
 Dorcadion cinerarium terkense Lazarev, 2011
 Dorcadion cinerarium veniamini Lazarev, 2011
 Dorcadion cinerarium zubovi Lazarev, 2011

References

cinerarium
Beetles described in 1787